Torricelli is a lunar impact crater in the eastern part of the Sinus Asperitatis, to the south of the Mare Tranquillitatis. It was named after Italian physicist Evangelista Torricelli. The western rim of the crater is broken open and joined to a smaller crater to the west. The entire formation has a pear-shaped appearance. Torricelli lies in the northeastern part of a circular formation of rises in the lunar mare, possibly the remains of a crater formation buried by lava.

Satellite craters
By convention these features are identified on lunar maps by placing the letter on the side of the crater midpoint that is closest to Torricelli.

References

External links

 , regarding Agrippa, Godin, Torricelli and Eratosthenes craters

Impact craters on the Moon